Stock Windmill is a grade II* listed tower mill at Stock, Essex, which has been restored.

History

Stock Windmill was built circa 1816 joining an existing post mill. In 1845, a second post mill was moved to a site close by. By 1862, the mill had four shuttered sails. The two post mills were demolished c.1890, about which time the millstones were moved down a floor and the drive converted from underdrift to overdrift. A steam engine was added in 1902 and the mill was working by wind until 1930 and afterwards by an internal combustion engine until c.1936. The mill was bought by Essex County Council in 1945 and although preserved, by 1977 it was without the fantail and associated supporting timbers, and down to only one pair of sails. Major repairs were started in 1991 by Vincent Pargeter. A grant from English Heritage part-funded the work. The Friends of Stock Mill were formed in 1993 on completion of the restoration.

Description

The mill is a five-storey tower mill with four single Patent sails It has a boat-shaped cap winded by a six-bladed fantail. The tower is  internal diameter at ground level and  internal diameter at curb level.

As built, the mill had a stage at first-floor level, four common sails and was winded by hand. It originally drove two pairs of overdrift millstones.

The cast-iron windshaft was probably not made for the mill originally. It carries a  diameter composite brake wheel with 81 cogs which has been converted from clasp arm construction. This drives a cast-iron wallower with 25 teeth. The cast-iron upright shaft is  diameter and in three parts, with dog clutches at the fourth and fifth floor. The cast-iron great spur wheel is  diameter with 76 cogs.

Millers
William Moss Sr 1816–
William (Jr) & John Moss –1838
William Moss Jr –1853
John Pertwee 1863–66
Joseph Clover 1870–90
Mary Clover 1894–98
William Mayes 1902–17
Frank Semmens 1926–29

References for above:-

Public access

Stock Windmill is open on the second Sunday of the month between April and September.

External links
Essex Country Parks webpage on Stock Tower Mill 
Windmill World webpage on Stock Mill

References

Tower mills in the United Kingdom
Grinding mills in the United Kingdom
Industrial buildings completed in 1816
Grade II* listed buildings in Essex
Museums in Essex
Stock, Essex
Grade II* listed windmills
Mill museums in England
1816 establishments in England